Arun Bakshi is an Indian film and television actor and also a singer. He has acted as a character actor in over 100 Hindi films, and as a playback singer has also sung 298 songs. He has also worked in Punjabi and Bhojpuri cinema. He also played the role of Mahant Dashrath Tripathi in Colors TV's Ishq Ka Rang Safed.

Biography
He was born and brought up in Ludhiana, Punjab, where he graduated from Arya College, Ludhiana. He worked with the Punjab Agricultural University for a while, before moving to Mumbai, to start his acting career in 1981, first in television and later films.

Bakshi is well known for his performances in B. R. Chopra's Mahabharat as Dhristadyumna, Guru, Kuch To Gadbad Hai and Masoom.

Filmography

Music

2011 Tum Hi To Ho... (playback singer) 
 
2010 Ashok Chakra: Tribute to Real Heroes (playback singer – as Aroon Bakshi) 
 
2002 Aankhen (playback singer) 
 
2000 [Dalaal No.1] (playback singer) 
 
1998 Chhota Chetan (playback singer – as Aroon Bakshi) 
 
1998 Hafta Vasuli (playback singer – as Aroon Bakshi) 
 
1995 Janam Kundli (playback singer) 
 
1995 God and Gun (playback singer) 
 
1994 Amanaat (playback singer) 
 
1994 Prem Yog (playback singer) 
 
1994 Gopi Kishan (playback singer) 
 
1994 Jai Kishen (playback singer) 
 
1993 Parwane (playback singer – as Aroon Bakshi)

1993 Platform (playback singer)
 
1993 Aankhen (playback singer)

1992 Adharm (playback singer)

1992 pyar dewana hota hai (playback singer)
 
1992 Balwaan (playback singer)

Composer
2010 Ashok Chakra: Tribute to Real Heroes (music / as Aroon Bakshi)

References

External links
 

Male actors from Ludhiana
Living people
Musicians from Ludhiana
Male actors in Hindi cinema
Bollywood playback singers
Male actors in Punjabi cinema
Male actors in Bhojpuri cinema
Indian male television actors
20th-century Indian male actors
21st-century Indian male actors
Singers from Punjab, India
Indian male playback singers
Year of birth missing (living people)